An election was held on November 8, 2016 to elect all 41 members to Delaware's House of Representatives. The election coincided with the elections for other offices, including U.S. President, U.S. House of Representatives, state governor and state senate. The primary election was held on September 13, 2016.

There was no change in the composition of the House as both Democrats and Republicans held on to their seats, winning 25 and 16 seats respectively.

Results

Statewide

District
Results of the 2016 Delaware House of Representatives election by district:

References

Delaware House of Representatives
House of Representatives
2016